The Citra Award for Best Actor is an award given at the Indonesian Film Festival (FFI) to Indonesian actors for their achievements in leading roles. The Citra Awards, described by Screen International as "Indonesia's equivalent to the Oscars", are the country's most prestigious film awards and are intended to recognize achievements in films as well as to draw public interest to the film industry.

Marthino Lio is the most recent winner for his performance in Vengeance Is Mine, All Others Pay Cash at the 2022 ceremony, winning his first Citra Award nomination.

History 
The Citra Awards, then known as the Indonesian Film Festival Awards, were first given in 1955 to two winners without a nomination process: AN Alcaff (Lewat Djam Malam) and A. Hadi (Tarmina).  The two-way tie, also found in the Best Film and Best Actress categories, was controversial as film critics considered Lewat Djam Malam the superior film, leading to allegations that Djamaluddin Malik had bought Tarmina prize. Succeeding festivals were held in 1960 and 1967 and annually since 1973.

There were no Citra Awards given between 1993 and 2003 due to sharp decline in domestic film production. It was reinstated as an annual event in 2004 after receiving funds from the Indonesian government.

Reza Rahadian is the most decorated actor with 3 awards out of 13 nominations, followed by Deddy Mizwar (3 wins out of 11 nominations) and Sukarno M. Noor (3 wins out of 3 nominations). Mizwar also holds the distinction of winning Best Actor for playing the same character twice: for Nagabonar in 1987 and its sequel 20 years later Nagabonar Jadi 2 in 2007. Ray Sahetapy received six nominations between 1984 and 1990 (except 1987), but did not win any.

Four actors—Mizwar, Rahadian, Nicholas Saputra, and Zainal Abidin—have received multiple nominations in a single year. All four won the award in the year they had double nominations, except for Rahadian's second (in 2015) and third (2020) double nominations, where he lost to Deddy Sutomo and Gunawan Maryanto respectively. Two films—Nagabonar Jadi 2 and Warkop DKI Reborn: Jangkrik Boss! Part 1—earned two lead actors nominations in 2007 and 2016 respectively. Only the former went on to win the award.

At the 1980 ceremony, no Best Actor award was given as the jury panel felt none of the nominated performances that year deserved to win.

Nominations and awards

Winners are highlighted in blue and listed in bold.

1950s

1960s

1970s

1980s

1990s

2000s

2010s

2020s

Multiple wins and nominations

Explanatory notes

See also 

 Cinema of Indonesia
 Indonesian Film Festival
Citra Award for Best Picture
 Citra Award for Best Director
 Citra Award for Best Actress
 Citra Award for Best Supporting Actor
 Citra Award for Best Supporting Actress
 Maya Awards

References



Citra Awards
Film awards for lead actor